"You Said" is a song recorded by Canadian country music group Farmer's Daughter. It was released in 1997 as the fourth single from their second studio album, Makin' Hay. It peaked at number 8 on the RPM Country Tracks chart in November 1997.

Chart performance

Year-end charts

References

1996 songs
1997 singles
Farmer's Daughter songs
MCA Records singles
Songs written by Beth Nielsen Chapman